Dub Lemna ingen Tighearnáin, Queen of Ireland, died 943.

Background

Dub Lemna was a daughter of Tighearnáin mac Seallachan, King of Breifne (died c. 888). Her brother, Ruarc mac Tighearnáin (fl. c. 893), was the eponym and ancestor of the clan Ó Ruairc, Kings of Breifne.

Marriage and children

Dub Lemna married Donnchad Donn of the Clann Cholmáin, who was King of Mide and High King of Ireland from 919 till his death in 944. She was his third wife. Her children by Donnchad are uncertain but they do not include Oengus mac Donnchada, who appears to have been a son of Cainnech ingen Canannán of Ailech, who died in 929.

This leaves sons Conn (died 944) and Domnall Donn (died 952), daughters Flann ingen Donnchad Donn (died 940) and Óebfhinn ingen Donnchad Donn

Annalistic reference

The Chronicon Scotorum, sub anno 943, state that "Dub Léna daughter of Tigernán, king of Bréifne, wife of the king of Temair, i.e. Donnchad son of Flann, dies.."

See also

 Dub Lémna

External links
 http://www.ucc.ie/celt/published/T100016/index.html

References
 Byrne, Francis John, Irish Kings and High-Kings. Batsford, London, 1973. 

9th-century births
943 deaths
Year of birth unknown

Irish royal consorts
10th-century Irish people
10th-century Irish women
People from County Cavan
People from County Meath